FACE AIDS was a student-led non-profit created in 2005 that mobilized students in the fight to end AIDS. FACE AIDS staff supported high school and college campuses across the country with personalized training as they raised funds to support the life-saving work of Partners In Health in HIV-affected communities in Rwanda. FACE AIDS chapters ensured that conversations about HIV/AIDS stayed active among their peers, and mobilized the next generation of leaders in social impact.

In 2014, FACE AIDS was invited to become a part of Partners In Health (PIH) as the new student branch of their community organizing program, PIH | Engage. In August 2014, FACE AIDS fully integrated their programs with PIH and closed operations.

History 
FACE AIDS began in 2005, when three students lost a friend to AIDS. While volunteering at a refugee camp, Jonny, Katie, and Lauren befriended a woman named Mama Katele. She was one of the few openly HIV-positive people in the camp, but despite knowing her status, she became sicker because she had no access to health care. Outraged by the devastating effects of AIDS on Katele, the stigma attached to the woman, and disparities in health care access, Jonny, Katie, and Lauren founded FACE AIDS in an effort to help their friend and to address these injustices.

Mama Katele died without ever receiving a dose of anti-retroviral therapy, but her life inspired Jonny, Katie, and Lauren to continue to confront these injustices and to build a national network of committed students.

Accomplishments 
By the time FACE AIDS closed in August 2014, FACE AIDS established chapters at over 200 colleges and high schools across the United States and raised over $3 million for Partners In Health. FACE AIDS sponsored 7 years of the Ride Against AIDS, a cross-country bike ride which aimed to (re)ignite conversations about HIV/AIDS. Together, the RAA teams raised over $300,000.

FACE AIDS also worked in Rwanda until 2012, establishing chapters at 13 health centers in eastern Rwanda. FACE AIDS directly employed over 350 HIV-affected Rwandans and supported their socioeconomic empowerment through structured savings and business training programs.

References

External links 
 FACE AIDS
 Partners In Health

HIV/AIDS organizations in the United States